The men's 55 kilograms competition at the 2022 World Weightlifting Championships was held on 6 December 2022.

Schedule

Medalists

Records

Results

References

Men's 55 kg